Ryde or Die Vol. 3: In the "R" We Trust is a compilation album from American hip hop record label Ruff Ryders Entertainment, released on December 18, 2001. The album was certified gold by Music Canada in August 2002 for sales of 50,000 units.

Track listing
Credits adapted from the album's liner notes.

Notes
 "Rock Bottom" contains background vocals by McAfee.
 "Shoot 'em In Tha Head" does not appear on the clean version of the album.

Samples
 "They Ain't Ready" contains a portion of the composition "Remix for P Is Free", written by Lawrence Parker and Scott La Rock.
 "U, Me & She" contains a portion of the composition "You, Me and He", written by James Mtume.

Charts

Weekly charts

Year-end charts

References

2001 compilation albums
Albums produced by David Banner
Albums produced by Irv Gotti
Albums produced by Swizz Beatz
Albums produced by Timbaland
Albums produced by Needlz
Interscope Records compilation albums
Ruff Ryders Entertainment compilation albums
Record label compilation albums
Hip hop compilation albums
Sequel albums